Natural Law, or Don't Put a Rubber on Your Willy is a book by Robert Anton Wilson published in 1987. The first edition was much shorter than most of his other works, but in 2022 Hilaritas Press published a second edition with an additional nine essays, two interviews, and one short story. The new edition is called Natural Law, Or Don't Put A Rubber On Your Willy And Other Writings From A Natural Outlaw.

1987 books
Discordianism
Consciousness studies
Books by Robert Anton Wilson
Loompanics books